Wolfgang P. Baumeister (born November 22, 1946 in Wesseling bordering Cologne) is a German molecular biologist and biophysicist. His research has been pivotal in the development of Cryoelectron tomography.

Education and career
After completing his Abitur, Wolfgang Baumeister studied biology, chemistry, and physics from 1966 to 1967 at the University of Münster and from 1967 to 1969 at the University of Bonn. At the Heinrich Heine University Düsseldorf he was a graduate student from 1970 to 1973 and a research associate from 1973 to 1980 in the department of biophysics. He received his Promotion in 1973 and his Habilitation in 1978. From 1981 to 1982 he was a Heisenberg Fellow at the physics department of the Cavendish Laboratory of England's University of Cambridge.

From 1983 to 1987 he was group leader (with rank C3, Professor Extraordinarius) of the “Molecular Structural Biology” working group at the Max Planck Institute of Biochemistry in Martinsried near Munich. The MPI's research department of “Molecular Structural Biology” does research involving molecular biological structures revealed by electron microscopy, cryoelectron tomography, protein and cell structure, and protein degradation He was an außerplanmäßiger Professor from 1984 to 1987 at the University of Düsseldorf and is since 1987 an außerplanmäßiger Professor in the Faculty of Chemistry of the Technical University of Munich. Since 1988 he is the head of the Max Planck Institute of Biochemistry's department of structural biology. Since 2000 he has also been an honorary professor in the Faculty of Physics of the Technical University of Munich.

Baumeister has served on the editorial boards of several journals, including Current Biology, the Journal of Microscopy, the Journal of Structural Biology, and Trends in Cell Biology. He is now the editor-in-chief of Biochemical and Biophysical Research Communications.

Honors and awards 
Baumeister was elected a member of the Bavarian Academy of Sciences in 2000, of the German National Academy of Sciences Leopoldina in 2001, and the National Academy of Sciences in 2010. In 2003 he was elected a fellow of the American Academy of Arts and Sciences. He has won many prizes, including in 1998 the Otto Warburg Medal, in 2003 both the Louis-Jeantet Prize and the I. & H. Wachter Award, in 2005 both the Harvey Prize and the Schleiden Medal, in 2006 the Ernst Schering Prize, in 2008 the Bijvoet Medal of the Bijvoet Centre for Biomolecular Research of Utrecht University, and in 2018 the Ernst Jung Gold Medal for Medicine.
 2022 Alexander Hollaender Award in Biophysics

References

1948 births
Living people
German biophysicists
German molecular biologists
Heinrich Heine University Düsseldorf alumni
Academic staff of Heinrich Heine University Düsseldorf
Academic staff of the Technical University of Munich
Max Planck Society people
Fellows of the American Academy of Arts and Sciences
Members of the Bavarian Academy of Sciences
Members of the German Academy of Sciences Leopoldina
Members of the United States National Academy of Sciences
Bijvoet Medal recipients
Max Planck Institute directors